Yuri Slesarev (born 1947) is a Russian pianist.

A graduate of Moscow Conservatory's Central Music School, he studied piano under Victor Merzhanov. After winning the All-Union Piano Competition in Tallinn in 1969, he took part in several international contests, winning the 1972 Montevideo Competition. He was active as a concert pianist through Europe and South America in subsequent years.

Slesarev is a People's Artist of Russia, and now teaches at the Moscow Conservatory. His pupils have included Vitaly Pisarenko and Vyacheslav Gryaznov.

References

Piano Forte News (newsletter interviewing Slesarev)

Russian classical pianists
Male classical pianists
Academic staff of Moscow Conservatory
Living people
1947 births
21st-century classical pianists
21st-century Russian male musicians